Tariqh Akoni  is a performing and session guitarist and songwriter based in Los Angeles, California. He is the former Chair of the Guitar Department at the L.A. Music Academy (succeeding Frank Gambale) as well as Musical Director for multi-platinum recording artist, Josh Groban
. Akoni performs in multiple genres, including classical, flamenco, and rock.

Early years

Tariqh grew up in Santa Barbara in a home filled with music from a diversity of genres, from Carlos Santana to Mac Davis to Sly and the Family Stone. His father was a college educator and his mother was a counselor.

Berklee College of Music

Following high school, Tariqh studied contemporary classical composition at the University of California at San Diego. But his guitar passion beckoned and he made the move to Boston to attend the famous Berklee School of Music. One highlight of this experience was his private study with jazz tenor saxophonist Jerry Bergonzi and jazz guitarist Rick Peckham.

Complementing his class study was Tariqh's focused daily practicing and, importantly, his nightly playing in the clubs of Boston where he was exposed to musical genres as diverse as blues, jazz and rock. Tariqh considers this latter to be where he found his musical voice. It was from his experiences with jazz saxophonist Walter Beasley and eminent sessions jazz saxophonist Gerald Albright that he found encouragement to pursue his musical career in Los Angeles.

Career
Tariqh assembled an extensive and eclectic resume, working with artists such as Stevie Wonder, Aretha Franklin, Elton John, George Duke, Herbie Hancock, Bette Midler, Tom Scott, Chaka Khan, Whitney Houston, the Backstreet Boys, and Aerosmith. Tariqh has toured nationally and internationally, most recently as the Musical Director and Conductor for Josh Groban. He is considered a "six-string virtuouso".

A select sampling of his appearances:

Selected performances and recordings

Josh Groban, Christina Aguilera, Elton John, Herbie Hancock, Patti LaBelle, Yolanda Adams, Luther Vandross, Al Jarreau, David Sanborn, Boyz II Men, Stevie Wonder, Smokey Robinson, Alicia Keys, Natalie Cole, Kenny Rogers, Huey Lewis and the News, Aretha Franklin, Toni Braxton, The Temptations, LeAnn Rimes, Jennifer Lopez, Jennifer Love Hewitt, Lee Ann Womack, Babyface, David Benoit, Lou Rawls, Carlos Santana, Bette Midler.

Selected television Appearances

37th NAACP Image Awards (House Band) (2006)
48th Annual Grammy Awards (music) (2006)
ABC's Christmas in Aspen (2002)
American Idol (House Band) (2005, 2006)
American Music Awards – w/ Josh Groban (2004)
Backstreet Boys: Larger than Life - CBS Special (2001) 
B.E.T. Annual Awards (2002, 2003)
B.E.T. Jazz Legends Concert
FAME (House Band) (2003)
Good Morning America (w/ Josh Groban, Christina Aguilera)
Jimmy Kimmel Live! (w/ Huey Lewis and the News) (2005)
The Late Late Show with Craig Kilborn  (w/ Anastacia, Javier)
Late Night with Conan O'Brien (w/ Josh Groban) (2004)
Late Show with David Letterman (w/ Christina Aguilera) (2006)
The Tonight Show with Jay Leno (w/ Yolanda Adams, Frankie J., Josh Groban, Backstreet Boys, Jennifer Love Hewitt)
Saturday Night Live (w/ Christina Aguilera) (2006)
MTV Movie Awards (w/ Christina Aguilera) (2006)
MTV Video Music Awards – w/ Josh Groban (2003)
PBS Great Performances: Josh Groban in Concert (2002), Live at the Greek (2004)
The Queen's Royal Variety Performance – w/ Jennifer Lopez (2001)
Smokey Robinson Walk of Fame (House Band) (2004)
UNCF Tribute to Lou Rawls (House Band) (2003)
UNCF Tribute to Aretha Franklin (House Band) (2006)
World Music Awards – with Josh Groban (2004)

Equipment 

Tariqh uses a diverse set of instruments, including Gibson, Tyler, McPherson, Blankenship, Bogner, Eventide, Voodoo Lab, Electro-Harmonix, and Seymour Duncan.

References

Year of birth missing (living people)
Living people
American session musicians
Berklee College of Music alumni
University of California, San Diego alumni
Musicians from Santa Barbara, California
Guitarists from Los Angeles